Phillip Hallam-Baker is a computer scientist, mostly known for contributions to Internet security, since the design of HTTP at CERN in 1992.  Self-employed since 2018 as a consultant and expert witness in court cases, he previously worked at Comodo, Verisign Inc., and at MIT Artificial Intelligence Laboratory. He is a frequent participant in IETF meetings and discussions, and has written a number of RFCs.  In 2007 he authored the dotCrime Manifesto: How to Stop Internet Crime; although the book is readable by novices, Ron Rivest still considered it a source of ideas for his course on Computer and Network Security at MIT in 2013.

Biography
Hallam-Baker has a degree in electronic engineering from the School of Electronics and Computer Science, University of Southampton and a doctorate in Computer Science from the Nuclear Physics Department at Oxford University. He was appointed a Post Doctoral Research Associate at DESY in 1992 and CERN Fellow in 1993.

Hallam-Baker worked with the Clinton-Gore ’92 Internet campaign. While at the MIT Laboratory for Artificial Intelligence, he worked on developing a security plan and performed seminal work on securing high-profile federal government internet sites.

IETF Contributions

  with J. Franks, J. Hostetler, P. Leach, A. Luotonen, E. Sink, L. Stewart, An Extension to HTTP : Digest Access Authentication
  with J. Franks, J. Hostetler, S. Lawrence, P. Leach, A. Luotonen, L. Stewart,  HTTP Authentication: Basic and Digest Access Authentication
  with S. Boeyen, Internet X.509 Public Key Infrastructure Repository Locator Service
  with T. Hansen, D. Crocker, DomainKeys Identified Mail (DKIM) Service Overview
  with T. Hansen, E. Siegel, D. Crocker,  DomainKeys Identified Mail (DKIM) Development, Deployment, and Operations
  with S. Santesson,  Online Certificate Status Protocol Algorithm Agility
  with R. Stradling, DNS Certification Authority Authorization (CAA) Resource Record
  with S. Farrell, D. Kutscher, C. Dannewitz, B. Ohlman, A. Keranen,  Naming Things with Hashes

References

External links 
 

People in information technology
Living people
People associated with CERN
Year of birth missing (living people)